Crawford Allan (born 16 May 1967) is a retired Scottish football referee. He was appointed Head of Referee Operations at the Scottish FA on the 13th January 2020.

Refereeing career 

Allan, who began his refereeing career in the early nineties, retired from refereeing shortly after his 50th birthday. His final match was a Scottish Premiership game between Hamilton Academical and Dundee at the end of the 2016–17 season.

References

External links
SoccerBase

1967 births
Living people
Scottish football referees
Scottish Football League referees
Scottish Premier League referees
Scottish Professional Football League referees